West Harrow is a locality directly to the west/southwest of Harrow town in the London Borough of Harrow, in the county of Greater London and historically in the county of Middlesex.

Location 
As its name suggests, West Harrow is located on the western side of Harrow, roughly covering the area to the west of Bessborough Road, to the south of Pinner Road and to the north of Whitmore Road. To the south east of West Harrow is Harrow on the Hill, to its north east is the town centre of Harrow, to its west is Rayners Lane, to its north is North Harrow, and to its south are Roxeth and South Harrow. The surrounding streets comprise original two storey Edwardian buildings an further developments predominately from the 1920's & 30's.

Arts, sports and culture 
The poet Tim Dooley, and several jazz musicians, pianist Alex Webb (musician) saxophonist Courtney Pine, and bassist Gary Crosby all live in the West Harrow area.

The neighbourhood is home to Oneforty Harrow. This is a gallery venue space and music studio with a boutique bar and cafe which service various events. Oneforty hosts regular live music open mike events, markets, art classes, wellness practitioners and mind body therapists.

Syd's Pizzeria and Coffee Shop opened in West Harrow Park in 2018. The park is a good example of a Victorian urban green space. The park also has: 

 free gym equipment
 a large children's and under-fives play area
 children's nursery
 free to use tennis and basketball courts
 cricket pitches
 wild flower areas
 paths which are disabled accessible

West Harrow Bowling Club was founded in 1928. The club is affiliated to Bowls England, Middlesex County Bowling Association and Harrow and District Bowling Association and enters teams, sometimes mixed, in midweek and evening leagues. Friends of West Harrow Park work with the local community and Harrow Council to promote park amenities.  

The West Harrow Allotment and Garden Association (WHAGA) was established in 1955. The Association aims to provide a voice for the plot holders on the two West Harrow allotment sites (as of January 2022 there are vacant plots available). The Association arranges trips to Wisley, the Royal Horticutural site, and other places. There is an annual plant sale in spring where you can get your runner beans, leeks, etc.

Archery - the Bowmen of Harrow Archery Club has been established now for over 30 years, with one of the few dedicated indoor ranges in the country. The club promotes archery in all its forms for young people and adults (Recurve, Barebow, American Flat Bow, Longbow, and Compound bows), except for Crossbow.

Restaurants 
West Harrow is within walking distance of North Harrow and Pinner Road restaurants and takeaways. The Indian gastro pub the Kingsfield Arms, the Castle and White Horse pubs are 15/20 minute walks.

Religion 
The area is well served for all principal religions, though the only religious centres in West Harrow are St Peter's Anglican church, and The Light on the Hill Spiritualist Church.  

welcome.

Schools 
Saint Peter's church hosts St Peter's Preschool - a day nursery located in West Harrow.  

The local primary school, Vaughan, is rated outstanding.  

Several secondary state schools about the borough serve West Harrow.  Whitmore.High School is the only one in West Harrow, & is rated 'outstanding' by Ofsted.

Demography 
In the 2011 census, 55.8% of the population was of BAME (Black, Asian and minority ethnic) background.

Harrow is the second safest borough in the Greater London Authority area. West Harrow being one of the safest wards in Harrow.  The overall crime rate in Harrow in 2020 was 60 crimes per 1,000 people. This compares favourably to London's overall crime rate, coming in 45% lower than the London rate of 87 per 1,000 residents. For England, Wales, and Northern Ireland as a whole, Harrow is among the top 10 safest cities, and the 2,057th most dangerous location out of all towns, cities, and villages.

Zoning information 

West Harrow is almost exclusively residential, with a few threads of localized commercial zoning around its edges and a small number of corner shops.

History 
Prior to the early 20th century, the area was overwhelmingly rural. The construction of the Uxbridge extension to the Metropolitan line in 1904, and specifically the new West Harrow tube station, triggered a steady growth of housing developments in the area, spreading out from the location of the new station and giving the area a new identity. 

In his 1973 BBC television film 'London suburbia, Metroland,' Sir John Betjeman stands in Vaughan Road and delivers a personal reflection on the growth of Metroland in rural Middlesex.

Several of the roads in West Harrow are named after teachers at Harrow School, as described by Betjeman in his film: Drury Road (Joseph Drury); Vaughan Road (Charles Vaughan); Butler Road (Henry Montagu Butler); Bowen Road (Edward Ernest Bowen); Sumner Road (Robert Carey Sumner); and Heath Road (Benjamin Heath); Merivale Road (Charles Merivale, one of the pair who started the Boat Race), Lascelles Avenue (Brian Piers Lascelles); Velacott Road (Pail Cairn Vellacott DSO).

Area amenities 
 West Harrow Park, The Ridgeway, West Harrow
Tennis courts
Basketball courts
West Harrow Bowling Club
 St. Peter's Church (Church of England), Sumner Road, West Harrow
 West Harrow Station, The Gardens, West Harrow

Transport and locale

Tube/Train

 West Harrow Station - Metropolitan line

Geography

References

Areas of London
Districts of the London Borough of Harrow